"Youth" (stylised in all caps as YOUTH) is a song by Australian singer and songwriter Troye Sivan from his debut studio album Blue Neighbourhood (2015). It was written by Sivan, Bram Inscore, Brett McLaughlin (Leland), Alex Hope and Allie X, and produced by Bram Inscore, SLUMS and Alex JL Hiew. The song premiered on 12 November 2015 on Shazam Top 20 at 7PM AEST and was officially released on 13 November 2015 as the album's second single.

"Youth" won Sivan's first ever Australian Recording Industry Association (ARIA) Awards in 2016 for Best Video and Song of the Year. Billboard ranked "Youth" at number 11 on their "100 Best Pop Songs of 2016" list.

Background
Sivan said "'Youth' is a song about the joy in naivety and being lost. It's about dropping everything, running away, making mistakes, and loving too hard, and how that's okay. "

Music video
A lyric video was released on 23 November 2015. The video was directed and produced by Scheme Engine and filmed in both Los Angeles and Seattle. Sivan filmed a music video for "Youth" in early February 2016. Later that month, the music video, directed by Malia James, premiered on his Vevo channel on YouTube. Amandla Stenberg and Lia Marie Johnson appear in the video.

Charts

Weekly charts

Year-end charts

Certifications

Release history

See also
 List of number-one dance singles of 2016 (U.S.)

References

2015 singles
2015 songs
Troye Sivan songs
EMI Records singles
Songs written by Alex Hope (songwriter)
Songs written by Leland (musician)
ARIA Award-winning songs
Songs written by Troye Sivan